Molly Joseph Ward  is a former Virginia Secretary of Natural Resources. She was appointed to this position by Governor Terry McAuliffe in 2014. Previously, she served as Special Assistant to the President and Deputy Director of Intergovernmental Affairs at The White House and as Mayor of Hampton, Virginia from 2008 to 2013.

References

External links
Virginia Secretary of Natural Resources

Living people
1961 births
University of Virginia alumni
William & Mary Law School alumni
Virginia Democrats
State cabinet secretaries of Virginia
Mayors of Hampton, Virginia
Women in Virginia politics